Patricia Elisa Durán Reveles (born 20 March 1972) is a Mexican politician affiliated with National Regeneration Movement. She was a federal deputy from the National Action Party in the LIX Legislature of the Mexican Congress representing the State of Mexico. After a stint as a local deputy with Movimiento Ciudadano, she changed to Morena and ran under that party for mayor of Naucalpan de Juárez.

References

1972 births
Living people
Politicians from the State of Mexico
Women members of the Chamber of Deputies (Mexico)
National Action Party (Mexico) politicians
Morena (political party) politicians
Members of the Chamber of Deputies (Mexico) for the State of Mexico